Javier de Jesús Zapata Villada (born 16 October 1969) is a Colombian former road racing cyclist, who was a professional rider from 1993 to 2004. He was nicknamed "El Milagroso" during his career.

Major results

1993
 1st  Overall Vuelta a Antioquia
 1st Stage 12 Vuelta a Colombia
 2nd Road race, National Road Championships
1994
 National Road Championships
2nd Road race
2nd Time trial
1995
 1st Overall Vuelta al Valle del Cauca
1996
 2nd Road race, National Road Championships
1997
 1st  Overall Vuelta a Venezuela
 1st Overall Vuelta al Valle del Cauca
 2nd Overall Clásico RCN
1st Stage 1
1999
 1st in Stage 1 Clásico RCN, Barbosa (COL)
2000
 1st  Overall Vuelta a Antioquia
 1st Stage 4 Vuelta a la Argentina
2001
 1st  Overall Vuelta a Antioquia
 1st Overall Vuelta al Valle del Cauca
 1st Stage 5 Vuelta a Colombia
 National Road Championships
2nd Time trial
3rd Road race
 10th Overall Clásico RCN
2003
 1st Overall Vuelta de la Paz
1st Stage 3a
 1st Stage 6 Clásico RCN
 2nd Overall Vuelta a Cundinamarca
1st Stage 4
 3rd Overall Vuelta a Boyacá
 3rd Overall Vuelta a los Santanderes
1st Stage 3
2004
 1st Overall Doble Sucre Potosí GP Cemento Fancesa
1st Stages 1 & 4
 1st Overall Doble Copacabana GP Fides
1st Stages 1, 3 & 6b
 1st Stage 3 GP Mundo Ciclistico
 1st Overall Clasico de Ejecutivos
1st Stages 1 & 2
 2nd Overall Vuelta de la Paz
 3rd Overall Clásica Club Deportivo Boyacá
 10th Overall Clásico RCN
1st Stage 5
2005
 1st Overall Clásica de Fusagasugá
1st Stage 2
 1st Overall Clásica Nacional Marco Fidel Suárez
1st Stages 2 & 4
 1st Stage 4 Vuelta a Colombia
 1st Stages 2 & 4 Clásico RCN
 1st Stage 2 Doble Copacabana GP Fides
 1st Stage 4 Vuelta al Tolima
 2nd Time trial, National Road Championships
2006
 1st Stage 10 (TTT) Vuelta a Colombia
 1st Stage 2 Vuelta a Antioquia
 1st Stages 2 & 5b Doble Copacabana GP Fides
 1st Stage 1 Clasica International de Tulcan
 1st Stage 2b Clásica de Fusagasugá
 3rd Overall Clásico RCN
 3rd Overall Doble Sucre Potosí GP Cemento Fancesa
 3rd Overall Clásica Ciudad de Girardot
1st Stage 4
2007
 1st Overall Tour of Virginia
1st Stage 2
 1st Overall Clásica Ciudad de Girardot
 1st Jin Mao Climb
 2nd Overall Doble Copacabana GP Fides
 2nd Overall Clásica Nacional Ciudad de Anapoima
1st Stage 2
 7th Overall Clásico RCN
1st Prologue
2008
 2nd Overall Vuelta a Antioquia
1st Stage 4
 2nd Overall Clásica Ciudad de Girardot
1st Stage 4
 10th Overall Vuelta a Bolivia
1st Stage 7a
2009
 3rd Time trial, National Road Championships

References
 
 

1969 births
Living people
People from Itagüí
Colombian male cyclists
Cyclists at the 1996 Summer Olympics
Olympic cyclists of Colombia
Vuelta a Colombia stage winners
Sportspeople from Antioquia Department
21st-century Colombian people